Griseargiolestes is a genus of damselflies in the family Megapodagrionidae.
They are medium-sized, black and green metallic damselflies with pale markings, endemic to eastern Australia.

Species 
The genus Griseargiolestes includes the following species:

Griseargiolestes albescens   - coastal flatwing
Griseargiolestes bucki   - turquoise flatwing
Griseargiolestes eboracus   - grey-chested flatwing
Griseargiolestes fontanus   - springs flatwing
Griseargiolestes griseus   - grey flatwing
Griseargiolestes intermedius   - alpine flatwing
Griseargiolestes metallicus   - metallic flatwing

See also
 List of Odonata species of Australia

References

Megapodagrionidae
Zygoptera genera
Odonata of Australia
Endemic fauna of Australia
Taxa named by Günther Theischinger
Insects described in 1998
Damselflies